Nataldillo is a genus of isopods belonging to the family Armadillidae.

Species:
 Nataldillo burnupi (Collinge, 1917) 
 Nataldillo brauni (Verhoeff, 1942) accepted as Nataldillo burnupi (Collinge, 1917)

References

Isopoda
Crustacean genera